Ristow may refer to:

 Place name
 Rzyszczewo, Białogard County, pronounced as 'Ristow', township in Poland, district of Białogard
 Rzyszczewo, Sławno County, pronounced as 'Ristow', township in Poland, district of Sławno

 Family name
 Christian Ristow, robotic and kinetic artist
  Luiz Eduardo Ristow, veterinarian and researcher
 Michael Ristow (born 1967), German physician and researcher
  Harold C. Ristow, former member of South Dakota State Senate
 Peter Ristow, German interior designer (Köln) 
 , German artist (Düsseldorf) 
 Walter Ristow, librarian and author